Lectionary 285, designated by siglum ℓ 285 (in the Gregory-Aland numbering) is a Greek manuscript of the New Testament, on parchment. Palaeographically it has been assigned to the 12th century.
Frederick Henry Ambrose Scrivener labelled it as 164e and 165e.

Only 37 leaves of the manuscript has survived.

Description 

The codex contains lessons from the Gospel of John, Matthew, and Luke (Evangelistarium), with some lacunae.

The text is written in Greek minuscule letters, on 37 parchment leaves, in two columns per page, 22) lines per page. The manuscript contains weekday Gospel lessons.

History 

Scrivener and Gregory dated the manuscript to the 12th century. It has been assigned by the Institute for New Testament Textual Research to the 12th century.

The manuscript was added to the list of New Testament manuscripts by Scrivener (number 164e and 165e) and Gregory (number 285e). Gregory saw the manuscript in 1886. According to Scrivener the first leaf belonged to the other manuscript. It was not confirmed by Gregory, Aland and other textual critics.

The manuscript is not cited in the critical editions of the Greek New Testament (UBS3).

The codex is housed at the Biblioteca Ambrosiana (I. 94 suss., fol. 1-37) in Milan.

See also 

 List of New Testament lectionaries
 Biblical manuscript
 Textual criticism
 Lectionary 284

Notes and references

Bibliography 

 

Greek New Testament lectionaries
12th-century biblical manuscripts
Manuscripts of the Ambrosiana collections